Deep time is a term introduced and applied by John McPhee to the concept of geologic time in his book Basin and Range (1981), parts of which originally appeared in the New Yorker magazine.
 
The philosophical concept of geological time was developed in the 18th century by Scottish geologist James Hutton (1726–1797); his "system of the habitable Earth" was a deistic mechanism keeping the world eternally suitable for humans. The modern concept entails huge changes over the age of the Earth which has been determined to be, after a long and complex history of developments, around 4.55 billion years.

Scientific concept 

Hutton based his view of deep time on a form of geochemistry that had developed in Scotland and Scandinavia from the 1750s onward.  As mathematician John Playfair, one of Hutton's friends and colleagues in the Scottish Enlightenment, remarked upon seeing the strata of the angular unconformity at Siccar Point with Hutton and James Hall in June 1788, "the mind seemed to grow giddy by looking so far into the abyss of time".

Early geologists such as Nicolas Steno (1638–1686) and Horace-Bénédict de Saussure (1740–1799) had developed ideas of geological strata forming from water through chemical processes, which Abraham Gottlob Werner (1749–1817) developed into a theory known as Neptunism, envisaging the slow crystallisation of minerals in the ancient oceans of the Earth to form rock.  Hutton's innovative 1785 theory, based on Plutonism, visualised an endless cyclical process of rocks forming under the sea, being uplifted and tilted, then eroded to form new strata under the sea. In 1788 the sight of Hutton's Unconformity at Siccar Point convinced Playfair and Hall of this extremely slow cycle, and in that same year Hutton memorably wrote "we find no vestige of a beginning, no prospect of an end".

Other scientists such as Georges Cuvier (1769–1832) put forward ideas of past ages, and geologists such as Adam Sedgwick (1785–1873) incorporated Werner's ideas into concepts of catastrophism; Sedgwick inspired his university student Charles Darwin to exclaim "What a capital hand is Sedgewick [sic] for drawing large cheques upon the Bank of Time!".  In a competing theory, Charles Lyell in his Principles of Geology (1830–1833) developed Hutton's comprehension of endless deep time as a crucial scientific concept  into uniformitarianism.  As a young naturalist and geological theorist, Darwin studied the successive volumes of Lyell's book exhaustively during the Beagle survey voyage in the 1830s, before beginning to theorise about evolution.

Physicist Gregory Benford addresses the concept in Deep Time: How Humanity Communicates Across Millennia (1999), as does paleontologist and Nature editor Henry Gee in In Search of Deep Time:  Beyond the Fossil Record to a New History of Life (2001)  Stephen Jay Gould's Time's Arrow, Time's Cycle (1987) also deals in large part with the evolution of the concept.

In Time's Arrow, Time's Cycle, Gould cited one of the metaphors McPhee used in explaining the concept of deep time:

Consider the Earth's history as the old measure of the English yard, the distance from the King's nose to the tip of his outstretched hand. One stroke of a nail file on his middle finger erases human history.

Concepts similar to geologic time were recognized in the 11th century by the Persian geologist and polymath Avicenna (Ibn Sina, 973–1037), and by the Chinese naturalist and polymath Shen Kuo (1031–1095).

The Roman Catholic theologian Thomas Berry (1914–2009) explored spiritual implications of the concept of deep time.  Berry proposes that a deep understanding of the history and functioning of the evolving universe is a necessary inspiration and guide for our own effective functioning as individuals and as a species. This view has greatly influenced the development of deep ecology and ecophilosophy. The experiential nature of the experience of deep time has also greatly influenced the work of Joanna Macy.

H. G. Wells and Julian Huxley regarded the difficulties of coping with the concept of deep time as exaggerated:

"The use of different scales is simply a matter of practice," they said in The Science of Life (1929).  "We very soon get used to maps, though they are constructed on scales down to a hundred-millionth of natural size ... to grasp geological time all that is needed is to stick tight to some magnitude which shall be the unit on the new and magnified scale—a million years is probably the most convenient—to grasp its meaning once and for all by an effort of imagination, and then to think of all passage of geological time in terms of this unit."

See also 

 Chronology of the Universe
 Formation of the Solar System
 History of Earth
 History of life
 Timeline of human evolution
 Big History
 Deep history
 Clock of the Long Now
 The World Without Us, a non-fiction book by Alan Weisman.

Footnotes

General references

Web

Books 
 
 
 
 Rossi, Paolo (1984). The Dark Abyss of Time: The History of the Earth and the History of Nations from Hooke to Vico, tr. by Lydia Cochrane, Chicago: University of Chicago Press, pp. 338, .

Journals

External links 
 "The benefits of embracing 'deep time' in a year like 2020" (Vincent Ialenti) BBC Future.
 ChronoZoom is a timeline for Big History being developed for the International Big History Association by Microsoft Research and University of California, Berkeley
 Deep Time in Evolution (TV series).  Note: This PBS/WGBH website advises Flash Player and Shockwave Player installation.
 Deep Time – A History of the Earth: Interactive Infographic
 Deep Time Walk App – A new story of the living Earth: Interactive Walking Experience
 "Embracing 'Deep Time' Thinking" (Vincent Ialenti) NPR Cosmos & Culture.
 "Pondering 'Deep Time' Could Inspire New Ways to View Climate Change" (Vincent Ialenti) NPR Cosmos & Culture.

Evolution
Geochronology
Historical geology
History of Earth science
Time